The boxing competitions at the 2024 Summer Olympics in Paris are scheduled to run from 27 July to 10 August. Preliminary boxing matches will occur at Arena Paris Nord in Villepinte, with the medal rounds (semifinals and finals) staged at the iconic Roland Garros Stadium. 

The boxing program for Paris 2024 will feature the same amount of weight categories as those in the previous three editions, consisting of thirteen in total (seven for men and six for women). Pursuant to the International Olympic Committee's mission of attaining full gender equality, the program continues to remain updated with the number of men's weight classes reduced by one contrary to the women's side by an increase of one weight category. 

In June 2022, the International Olympic Committee (IOC) barred the International Boxing Association's (IBA) rights to run and organize the tournament due to "continuing irregularity issues in the areas of finance, governance, ethics, refereeing, and judging". Hence, the IOC executive board established and ratified a new qualification system for Paris 2024 that would witness the boxers obtain the quota spots through the continental multisport events, such as Asian Games, European Games, Pan American Games, African Games, and the Pacific Games.

Competition format
Pursuant to the IOC's mission of attaining full gender equality, Paris 2024 will institute another significant change to the boxing program, with the number of weight categories for men reduced from eight to seven, ultimately removing the light heavyweight division. On the other hand, the women's weight classes witness a corresponding rise from five to six with the bantamweight category introduced.

The male boxers will contest matches in these seven weight classes:

Lightweight (63.5kg)
Welterweight (71kg)
Middleweight (80kg)
Heavyweight (92kg)
Super heavyweight (+92kg)

The female boxers will contest matches in these six weight classes:

Qualification

A total of 248 quota places, with an equal distribution between men and women, are available for eligible boxers to compete in Paris 2024, almost forty fewer overall than those in Tokyo 2020. Qualified NOCs could only send one boxer in each weight category. The host nation France reserves a maximum of six quota places to be equally distributed between men and women in their respective weight categories, while nine places (four for men and five for women) will be entitled to eligible NOCs interested to have their boxers compete in Paris 2024 as abided by the Universality principle.

The qualification period commences in five regional multisport events (African Games, Asian Games, European Games, Pacific Games, and the Pan American Games), set to be served as continental qualifying meets, where a total of 139 spots will be assigned to a specific number of highest-ranked boxers in each weight category. Following the continental phase, the remainder of the total quota will be decided in two world qualification tournaments organized by the IOC in the initial half of the 2024 season, offering another batch of spots available to the highest-ranked eligible boxers in each weight division.

Men

Women

Medal summary

Medal table

Men's events

Women's events

See also
Boxing at the 2022 Asian Games
Boxing at the 2023 African Games
Boxing at the 2023 European Games
Boxing at the 2023 Pan American Games

References

 
2024
2024 Summer Olympics events
Olympics
Boxing competitions in France